Elwira Seroczyńska, née Potapowicz (1 May 1931 – 24 December 2004) was a Polish speed skater.

Seroczyńska was born as Elwira Potapowicz in Wilno, Poland (now Vilnius, Lithuania). A graduate of the State Administrative and Economic School in Elbląg (1951), she and became Polish Allround Champion for the first time in 1952. She would eventually become Polish Allround Champion a total of five times, last in 1963. Apart from her allround titles she won 17 distance titles (some also count the out of competition 1953 1000m race as a title) and established 16 official Polish distance records and one combination record. Curiously several combinations skated at Polish championships were never recognised as being a Polish record due to the combination of distances skated. During her skating career she was member of Stal Elbląg (1950–1953), FSO-Stal Warszawa (1954–1957) and Sarmata Warszawa (1957–1964). At the 1960 Winter Olympics, she won a silver medal on the 1,500 m. At the 1962 World Championships in Imatra, she won a Gold Medal on the 500m.  After her skating career she studied at the Warsaw Academy of Physical Education (1972), where she received a master's degree and became trainer of the Polish skating team. She died in London, United Kingdom at the age of 73.

Results

Personal records

References

Notes

Bibliography

 Eng, Trond and Koolhaas, Marnix. National All Time & Encyclopedia, Men/Ladies as at 1.7.1986. Issue No.5 "Eastern Europe". Degernes, Norway: WSSSA-Skøytenytt, 1986.
 Żemantowski, Jacek. Lyżwiarski Jubileusz: 80 lat Polski Związek Lyżwiarstwa Szybkiego. Warszawa, Poland: PZLS, 2001.
 Zieleśkiewicz, Władysław. Encyklopedia sportów zimowych. Warszawa, Poland: Wydawnictwo Naukowe PWN, 2001. .

External links
 
 
 

1931 births
2004 deaths
Polish female speed skaters
Speed skaters at the 1960 Winter Olympics
Speed skaters at the 1964 Winter Olympics
Olympic speed skaters of Poland
Olympic silver medalists for Poland
Sportspeople from Vilnius
People from Wilno Voivodeship (1926–1939)
Olympic medalists in speed skating
Medalists at the 1960 Winter Olympics
20th-century Polish women